Varanasi is one of the most prominent tourist places in India. The city attracts millions of domestic and international tourists. The temples across the city attract pilgrims. The ghats and the Buddhist site Sarnath attract tourists from abroad. Varanasi is one of the oldest cities in the world, which makes it rich with cultural heritage. The city is home to ghats, temples, museums, and many Puranic places.  



List

See also
Hindu temples in Varanasi
Ghats in Varanasi

References

 
Tourism
Varanasi
Varanasi